Gruszczyn may refer to the following places:
Gruszczyn, Kozienice County in Masovian Voivodeship (east-central Poland)
Gruszczyn, Lipsko County in Masovian Voivodeship (east-central Poland)
Gruszczyn, Świętokrzyskie Voivodeship (south-central Poland)
Gruszczyn, Greater Poland Voivodeship (west-central Poland)